Tsongkhapa (meaning: "the man from Tsongkha" or "the Man from Onion Valley", c. 1357–1419) was an influential Tibetan Buddhist monk, philosopher and tantric yogi, whose activities led to the formation of the Gelug school of Tibetan Buddhism. He is also known by his ordained name Losang Drakpa (Skt. Sumatikīrti) or simply as "Je Rinpoche" ("Precious Lord"). He is also known by Chinese as Zongkapa Lobsang Zhaba or just Zōngkàbā (宗喀巴).

Tsongkhapa was born in Amdo, the son of a Tibetan Longben Tribal leader who also once served as an official of the Yuan Dynasty. It is said that Tsongkhapa's father was probably a Mongolian because he was the head of a Tibetian tribe in Yuan Dynasty. It is possible that a Tibetan philosopher was born from the family of a Mongolian leader. As a monk, Tsongkhapa studied under numerous teachers of the various Tibetan Buddhist traditions which flourished in central Tibet, including Sakya, Jonang, Kagyu and Kadam.

Tsongkhapa was a prolific author with a broad knowledge of Buddhist philosophy, logic, hermeneutics and practice. He wrote numerous works on madhyamaka philosophy (such as Ocean of Reasoning, a commentary on the  Mūlamadhyamakakārikā), Mahayana practice (such as Lamrim Chenmo), and Vajrayana (Great Exposition of Secret Mantra). His philosophical works are mainly a synthesis of the Buddhist epistemological tradition of Dignāga and Dharmakīrti and the madhyamaka philosophy of Nāgārjuna and Candrakīrti.

According to John Powers, Tsongkhapa's work "contains a comprehensive view of Buddhist philosophy and practice that integrates sutra and tantra, analytical reasoning, and yogic meditation." Guy Newland describes Tsongkhapa's philosophical approach as one which combines the existence and validity of logic and ethics (conventionally and contingently) with "a radical view of emptiness" which sees all phenomena as devoid of intrinsic nature.

According to Jay L. Garfield, Tsongkhapa also held that it was necessary to develop a correct view of the true nature of reality, and that to do this one had to engage in rigorous study, reasoned analysis and contemplation (alongside of meditation). As Garfield notes, this view of emptiness is not a kind of nihilism or a total denial of existence. Instead, it sees phenomena as existing "interdependently, relationally, non-essentially, conventionally" (which Tsongkhapa terms "mere existence").

Biography

Early years and studies 
With a Mongolian father and a Tibetan mother, Tsongkhapa was born into a nomadic family in the walled city of Tsongkha in Amdo, Tibet (present-day Haidong and Xining, Qinghai) in 1357. Tsongkhapa was educated in Buddhism from an early age by his first teacher, the Kadam monk Choje Dondrub Rinchen. Tsongkhapa became novice monk at the age of six.

When he was sixteen, Tsongkhapa traveled to Central Tibet (Ü-Tsang), where he studied at the scholastic institutions of the Sangphu monastery, the Drikung Kagyu and the Sakya tradition of Sakya paṇḍita (1182–1251). At the Drikung Thil Monastery he studied under Chenga Chokyi Gyalpo, the great patriarch of Drikung Kagyu, and received teachings on numerous topics like Mahamudra and the Six Dharmas of Naropa. Tsongkhapa also studied Tibetan medicine and then all the great Buddhist scholastic subjects including abhidharma, ethics, epistemology (Sk. pramāṇa), Vajrayana and various lineages of Buddhist tantra.

Tsongkhapa studied widely under numerous teachers from various Tibetan Buddhist traditions. His main teachers include: the Sakya masters Rendawa and Rinchen Dorje, the Kagyu master Chenga Rinpoche and the Jonang masters Bodong Chakleh Namgyal, Khyungpo Hlehpa and Chokyi Pelpa. Tsongkhapa also received all of the three main Kadampa lineages. He received the Lam-Rim lineage, and the oral guideline lineage from the Nyingma Lama, Lhodrag Namka-gyeltsen; and he received the lineage of textual transmission from Lama Umapa.

Rendawa Zhönnu Lodrö was Tsongkhapa most important teacher. Under Rendawa, Tsongkhapa studied various classic works, including the Pramanavarttika, the Abhidharmakosha, the Abhidharmasamuccaya and the Madhyamakavatara. Tsongkhapa also studied with a Nyingma teacher, Drupchen Lekyi Dorje, also known as Namkha Gyaltsen (1326–1401).

During his early years, Tsongkhapa also composed a few original works, including the Golden Garland, a commentary on the Abhisamayālaṃkāra from the perspective of the Yogācāra-svātantrika-madhyamaka tradition of Śāntarakṣita which also attempts to refute the shentong views of Dolpopa (1292–1361).

Retreats and visions of Mañjuśrī 

From 1390 to 1398, Tsongkhapa engaged in extended meditation retreats (with a small group of attendants) in various locations (the most well known of which is in the Wölkha Valley). He also developed a close relationship with a mystic and hermit named Umapa Pawo Dorje, who was known for his connection to Mañjuśrī bodhisattva and who had frequent visions of black Mañjuśrī with whom he would communicate. Umapa acted as a medium for Tsongkhapa, who eventually began having his own visions of Mañjuśrī.

During this period of extensive meditation retreat, Tsongkhapa had numerous visions of guru Mañjuśrī (Jamyang Lama). During these visions he would receive teachings from the bodhisattva and ask questions about the right view of emptiness and about Buddhist practice. An important instruction which Tsongkhapa is said to have received about the view from Mañjuśrī is: "It is inappropriate to be partial either to emptiness or to appearance. In particular, you need to take the appearance aspect seriously." Tsongkhapa would also discuss these visions and instructions with his teacher Rendawa (and some record of this correspondence has survived). During this period, Tsongkhapa is also said to have received a series of oral transmissions from Mañjuśrī. These later came be called the Mañjuśrī cycle of teachings.

In 1397 while in intensive meditation retreat at Wölkha Valley, Tsongkhapa writes that he had a “major insight” (ngeshé chenpo) into the view of emptiness. Initially Tsongkhapa had a dream of the great madhyamaka masters (Nagarjuna, Buddhapalita, Aryadeva and Candrakirti). In this dream, Buddhapālita placed a wrapped text on the top of Tsongkhapa's head. After waking from this dream, Tsongkhapa began to study Buddhapālita's commentary to Nagarjuna's Middle Way Verses. As he was reading chapter 18, his understanding became crystal clear and all his doubts vanished. According to Thupten Jinpa "at the heart of Tsongkhapa’s breakthrough experience was a profound realization of the equation of emptiness and dependent origination." He then spent the next spring and summer in deep meditation, experiencing great bliss, devotion and gratitude to the Buddha.

Mature Period 

In the later period of Tsongkhapa's life, he composed a series of works on Buddhist philosophy and practice. Perhaps his most famous work is the Great Exposition of the Stages of the Path (Lam rim chen mo, c. 1402). This lamrim ("stages of the path) text outlines the Mahayana path to enlightenment and also presents Tsongkhapa's view of emptiness and the middle way view (madhyamaka). Also during this period, he wrote his major work on tantric practice, the Great Exposition of Tantra (Sngags rim chen mo).

Tsongkhapa also wrote some other main works during this period, including Essence of Eloquence (Legs bshad snying po), Ocean of Reasoning (Rigs pa'i rgya mtsho, a commentary on Nagarjuna's classic Mūlamadhyamakakārikā), the Medium-Length Lamrim, and Elucidation of the Intent (dGongs pa rab gsal), his last major writing.

According to Garfield:the major philosophical texts composed in the remaining twenty years of his life develop with great precision and sophistication the view he developed during this long retreat period and reflect his realization that while Madhyamaka philosophy involves a relentlessly negative dialectic — a sustained critique both of reification and of nihilism and a rejection of all concepts of essence—the other side of that dialectic is an affirmation of conventional reality, of dependent origination, and of the identity of the two truths, suggesting a positive view of the nature of reality as well.

In 1409, Tsongkhapa worked on a project to renovate the Jokhang temple, the main temple in Lhasa and he also promoted a great 15 day prayer festival at Jokhang to celebrate Sakyamuni Buddha. In 1409, Tsongkhapa also worked to found Ganden monastery, located 25 miles north of Lhasa. Two of his students, Tashi Palden (1379–1449) and Shakya Yeshey (1354–1435) respectively founded Drepung monastery (1416), and Sera Monastery (1419). Together with Ganden, these three would later become the most influential Gelug monasteries in Tibet and also the largest monasteries in the world. These institutions became the center of a new growing school of Tibetan Buddhism, the Ganden or Gelug sect.

Death and legacy 

Tsongkhapa died in 1419 at the age of 62 at Ganden monastery. At the time of his death he was a well known figure in Tibet with a large following. Jinpa notes that various sources from other Tibetan Buddhist schools, like Pawo Tsuklak Trengwa and Shākya Chokden both write about how large numbers of Tibetans in the flocked to Tsongkhapa's new Gelug tradition during the 15th century. Tsongkhapa's three principal disciples were Khedrup Gelek Palsang, Gyaltsap Darma Rinchen and Dülzin Drakpa Gyaltsen. According to Jinpa, other important students of Tsongkhapa were "Tokden Jampel Gyatso; Jamyang Chöjé and Jamchen Chöjé, the founders of Drepung and Sera monasteries, respectively; and the First Dalai Lama, Gendün Drup."

After Tsongkhapa's death, his disciples worked to spread his teachings and the Gelug school grew extremely rapidly across the Tibetan plateau, founding or converting numerous monasteries. The new Gelug tradition saw itself as descendants of the Kadam school and emphasized monastic discipline and rigorous study of the Buddhist classics. According to Jinpa, by the end of the fifteenth century, the "new Ganden tradition had spread through the entire Tibetan cultural area, with monasteries upholding the tradition located in western Tibet, in Tsang, in central and southern Tibet, and in Kham and Amdo in the east."

After his death, Tsongkhapa's works also came to be published in woodblock prints, making them much more accessible. Several biographies and hagiographies of Tsongkhapa were also written by Lamas of different traditions. Tsongkhapa was also held in high regard by key figures of other Tibetan Buddhist traditions. Mikyö Dorje, 8th Karmapa, in a poem called In Praise of the Incomparable Tsong Khapa, calls Tsongkhapa "the reformer of Buddha’s doctrine", "the great charioteer of Madhyamaka philosophy in Tibet", "supreme among those who propound emptiness", and "one who had helped spread robe-wearing monastics across Tibet and from China to Kashmir". Wangchuk Dorje, 9th Karmapa Lama, praised Tsongkhapa as one "who swept away wrong views with the correct and perfect ones".

Tsongkhapa's works and teachings became central for the Ganden or Gelug school, where he is seen as a major authoritative figure. Their interpretation and exegesis became a major focus of Gelug scholasticism. They were also very influential on later Tibetan philosophers, who would either defend or criticize Tsongkhapa's views on numerous points.

Tsongkhapa's madhyamaka thought has become widely influential in the western scholarly understanding of madhyamaka, with the majority of books and articles (beginning in the 1980s) initially being based on Gelug explanations.

Hagiography 
After his death, Tsongkhapa came to be seen as a second Buddha in the Gelug tradition. Numerous hagiographies were written by Gelug figures such as Khedrup Je and Tokden Jampel Gyatso. These texts developed the great myths of the Tsongkhapa (and included stories of his previous births). Over time, an extensive collection of myths and stories about Tsongkhapa accumulated.

According to these myths, Tsongkhapa had been a student of Mañjuśrī for numerous past lives. In a former life, he had made the aspiration to spread Vajrayāna and the perfect view of emptiness in front of the Buddha Indraketu. Tsongkhapa then received a prophecy from numerous Buddhas which said that he would become the tathāgata Siṁhasvara (Lion's Roar). Another story tells of how during Śākyamuni's life, Tsongkhapa was a Brahmin boy who offered the Buddha a crystal rosary and generated bodhicitta. The Buddha prophesied that the boy would one day be the reviver of the Buddha's doctrine. Hagiographies such as Khedrup Je's also depict how Tsongkhapa achieved full Buddhahood after his death. Some hagiographical sources also claim that Tsongkhapa was an emanation of Mañjuśrī as well as a reincarnation of Nāgārjuna, Atiśa and of Padmasambhava.

Philosophy

Tsongkhapa's philosophy is mainly based on that of Indian madhyamaka philosophers like Nagarjuna, Buddhapalita and Chandrakirti. Tsongkhapa also draws on the epistemological tradition of Dharmakirti in his explanation of conventional truth. According to Jay Garfield, Tsongkhapa's philosophy is based on the idea that "a complete understanding of Buddhist philosophy requires a synthesis of the epistemology and logic of Dharmakirti with the metaphysics of Nagarjuna." According to Thomas Doctor, Tsongkhapa's madhyamaka views were also influenced by 12th-century Kadam school madhyamaka Mabja Changchub Tsöndrü (d. 1185).

Tsongkhapa is also known for his emphasis on the importance of philosophical reasoning in the path to liberation. According to Tsongkhapa, meditation must be paired with rigorous reasoning in order "to push the mind and precipitate a breakthrough in cognitive fluency and insight."

According to Thupten Jinpa, Tsongkhapa's thought was concerned with three main misinterpretations of madhyamaka philosophy in Tibet:

 a nihilistic or overly skeptical reading of prasangika-madhyamaka which denigrates or undermines the everyday world of experience and the validity of epistemology (Patsab is one figure who Tsongkhapa sees as associated with this view).
 the so-called "shentong madhyamaka" view of the Jonang school and its founder Dolpopa, which Tsongkhapa sees as absolutist and essentialist.
 a view which held that conceptual analysis and correct views were unnecessary and that what mattered was to get rid of all thought or to get rid of all concepts or to just remain in single pointed concentration (as thoughts arise and pass). Tsongkhapa saw these ideas as being associated with the Chinese Chan figure of Heshang and some Tibetan Buddhists. He held that these quietist views (which reject study and conceptual analysis) were soteriological dead-ends and could potentially have negative ethical consequences.

According to Thupten Jinpa, one of Tsongkhapa's main concerns was "to delineate the parameters of Madhyamaka reasoning in such a way that Madhyamaka dialectics cannot be seen to negate the objects of everyday experience and, more importantly, ethics and religious activity" or as Tsongkhapa put it, one must "correctly identify the object of negation" (which is svabhava). Tsongkhapa held that if one did not properly understand what is to be negated in madhyamaka, one was at risk of either negating too much (nihilism) or negating too little (essentialism), and thus one would "miss the mark" of madhyamaka. According to Jinpa, the correct object of negation for Tsongkhapa is "our innate apprehension of self-existence" which refers to how even our normal ways of perceiving the world "are effected by a belief in some kind of intrinsic existence of things and events". Jinpa also writes that the second major aspect of Tsongkhapa's philosophical project "entails developing a systematic theory of reality in the aftermath of an absolute rejection of intrinsic existence".

View of ultimate truth and emptiness 
Tsongkhapa follows Nagarjuna and Candrakirti in asserting that all phenomena are empty of inherent existence or essence (svabhava) because they are dependently originated.{{refn|group=note|According to Jay Garfield, "[a] fundamental tenet of any Buddhist school is that all phenomena are dependently originated. In Madhyamaka Buddhist thought, following Candrakrti [...], this dependency is glossed in three ways":
Pratītyasamutpāda or 'dependent arising.' All things arise in dependence on causes and conditions, and cease when those causes and conditions are no longer present.
All wholes are dependent upon their parts for existence, and all parts are dependent on their wholes for existence.{{refn|group=subnote|"Although both from the standpoint of reality and from that of everyday life, The sevenfold reasoning shows that a chariot cannot be established, in everyday life, without analysis it is designated in dependence on its parts."<ref>Madhyamakāvatāra, VI:159", trans. Garfield</ref>}}
Prajñaptir upādāya or 'dependent designation.' All phenomena are dependent for their existence on conceptual imputation.}} For Tsongkhapa, all phenomena lack inherent existence and come into existence relative to a designating consciousness which co-arises with that phenomenon.{{refn|group=note|Designation is, according to Kelsang Gyatso's translation of Lorig, the application of a conceptual image or term to a selected object of mere experience. According to Tsongkhapa, only a negation which undercuts the innate perception of an inherently existing self is truly liberating.

Tsongkhapa rejects the idea that meditation is only about throwing away all concepts, instead, we need to gradually refine our understanding until it becomes non-conceptual wisdom. While Tsongkhapa emphasizes the importance of attaining the correct conceptual understanding of emptiness through this analytical contemplation, he also understands that this knowledge is not the actual realization of emptiness itself (which is non-conceptual and non-dualistic). As such, according to Tsongkhapa, after one has attained the correct conceptual understanding of emptiness, this insight needs to be refined through repeated calming meditation practice (and the samadhi which it produces) and continued familiarization with insight meditation. Over time, one's insight is transformed into a nondualistic and non-conceptual experience of emptiness.

 Vajrayana (Secret Mantra) 

Tsongkhapa also practised and taught extensively on Vajrayana (i.e. Secret Mantra) Buddhism. He wrote commentaries on some of the main Sarma tantras, including the Vajrabhairava, Cakrasaṃvara, Kālacakra and Guhyasamāja tantras. He also wrote a grand summary of tantric thought and practice, The Great Exposition of Secret Mantra. Tsongkhapa's tantric theory draws extensively on the two main commentarial traditions of the Guhyasamāja Tantra. Tsongkhapa also heavily relies on the works of Marpa Lotsawa (1012–1097) and Butön Rinchendrub (1290–1364), both of whom passed down lineages of the Guhyasamāja tantra, a text which Tsongkhapa considered to be the "king of tantras".Tsongkhapa, The Dalai Lama, Hopkins, Jeffrey (2016), p. vii. His close connection to the Guhyasamāja tradition was such that he referred to himself as a "Guhyasamāja yogi" and saw himself as a reviver and reformer of the tradition (and thus he composed various works on this tantric tradition).

For Tsongkhapa, Buddhist tantra is based on the same madhyamaka view of emptiness as sutra (non-tantric) Mahāyāna and that they both also share the same goal (Buddhahood). As such, Tsongkhapa sees Secret Mantra as being a subset of Mahāyāna Buddhism, and thus it also requires bodhicitta and insight into emptiness (through vipaśyanā meditation) as a foundation. Secret Mantra is only differentiated from sutra by its special method, the esoteric practice of deity yoga (Tib. lha'i rnal 'byor), which is a much faster method than the practice of the six perfections alone.Tsongkhapa, The Dalai Lama, Hopkins, Jeffrey (2016), pp. viii, 189-194. Tsongkhapa also argues that complete Buddhahood can ultimately only be attained through the practice of Highest Yoga Tantra (while the lower practices of the perfections and the other tantras aid one in advancing on the path). However, Tsongkhapa also holds that non-tantric Mahāyāna practices are indispensable the practice of Secret Mantra and that bodhicitta is the basis for the practice of both sutra Mahāyāna and Secret Mantra.

Thus, for Tsongkhapa, the sutra bodhisattva path (and its three principal aspects of renunciation, bodhicitta and insight into emptiness) must precede the practice of Secret Mantra. Indeed, according to Tsongkhapa, without having ascertained emptiness, one cannot practice the tantric yogas of Vajrayana. As Tsongkhapa states in A Lamp to Illuminate the Five Stages:for those who enter the Vajra Vehicle, it is necessary to search for an understanding of the view that has insight into the no-self emptiness and then to meditate upon its significance in order to abandon holding to reality, the root of samsara.

Works

Tsongkhapa promoted the study of pramana (epistemology), encouraged formal debates as part of Dharma studies, and instructed disciples in the Guhyasamāja, Kalacakra, and Hevajra Tantras. Tsongkhapa's writings comprise eighteen volumes, with the largest amount being on Guhyasamāja tantra. These 18 volumes contain hundreds of titles relating to all aspects of Buddhist teachings and clarify some of the most difficult topics of Sutrayana and Vajrayana teachings. Tsongkhapa's main treatises and commentaries on Madhyamaka are based on the tradition descended from Nagarjuna as elucidated by Buddhapālita and Candrakīrti.

Major works
Some of the major works of Tsongkhapa are: 
 The Great Treatise on the Stages of the Path to Enlightenment (lam rim chen mo),
 The Great Exposition of Secret Mantra (sngags rim chen mo),
 Essence of True Eloquence (drang nges legs bshad snying po; full title: gsung rab kyi drang ba dang nges pai don rnam par phye ba gsal bar byed pa legs par bshad pai snying po),
 Ocean of Reasoning: A Great Commentary on Nagarjuna's Mulamadhyamakakarika (dbu ma rtsa ba'i tshig le'ur byas pa shes rab ces bya ba'i rnam bshad rigs pa'i rgya mtsho),Illumination of the Meaning of the Middle Path (dbu ma dgongs pa rab gsal), a commentary on Candrakirti's Madhyamakavatara,
 Brilliant Illumination of the Lamp of the Five Stages / A Lamp to Illuminate the Five Stages (gsang 'dus rim lnga gsal sgron), a commentary on Guhyasamaja,
 Golden Garland of Eloquence (gser phreng), a commentary to the Ornament for the Clear Realizations (Abhisamayālaṃkāra),
 The Praise of Relativity (rten 'brel bstod pa).

English translations
BiographyLife and Teachings of Tsongkhapa, Library of Tibetan Works and Archives, 2006. .
Lam Rim Chenmo The Great Treatise On The Stages Of The Path To Enlightenment, Vol. 1, Snow Lion. .The Great Treatise On The Stages Of The Path To Enlightenment, Vol. 2, Snow Lion. .The Great Treatise On The Stages Of The Path To Enlightenment, Vol. 3, Snow Lion. .Calming the Mind and Discerning the Real: From the Lam rim chen mo of Tson-kha-pa, trans. Alex Wayman, Columbia University Press. .Dependent-Arising and Emptiness: A Tibetan Buddhist Interpretation of Mādhyamika Philosophy, trans. Elizabeth Napper, Wisdom Publications. : this volume "considers the special insight section of" the Lam Rim (p. 8).  
Medium Lam RimThe Medium Treatise On The Stages Of The Path To Enlightenment – Calm Abiding Section translated in "Balancing The Mind: A Tibetan Buddhist Approach To Refining Attention", Shambhala Publications, 2005. .The Medium Treatise On The Stages Of The Path To Enlightenment – Insight Section translated in "Life and Teachings of Tsongkhapa", Library of Tibetan Works and Archives, 2006. .The Medium Treatise on the Stages of the Path to Enlightenment (Calm Abiding Section), translated in B. Alan Wallace, Dissertation, 1995 (Wylie: byang chub lam gyi rim pa chung ba).
Small Lam Rim
 .
Golden Garland of EloquenceGolden Garland of Eloquence – Volume 1 of 4: First Abhisamaya, Jain Pub Co, 2008. .Golden Garland of Eloquence – Volume 2 of 4: Second and Third Abhisamayas, Jain Pub Co, 2008. .Golden Garland of Eloquence – Volume 3 of 4: Fourth Abhisamaya, Jain Pub Co, 2010. .Golden Garland of Eloquence – Volume 4 of 4: Fourth Abhisamaya, Jain Pub Co, 2013. .
MadhyamakaOcean of Reasoning: A Great Commentary on Nagarjuna's Mulamadhyamakakarika, Oxford University Press. .Essence of True Eloquence, translated in The Central Philosophy of Tibet, Princeton University Press. .Guided Tour Through the Seven Books of Dharmakirti, translated in A Millennium of Buddhist Logic, Motilal Barnasidass, 1999. .
TantraThe Fulfillment of All Hopes: Guru Devotion in Tibetan Buddhism, Wisdom Publications. .Tantric Ethics: An Explanation of the Precepts for Buddhist Vajrayana Practice, Wisdom Publications. .The Great Exposition of Secret Mantra - Chapter 1 of 13, translated in Tantra in Tibet, Shambhala Publications, 1987. .The Great Exposition of Secret Mantra - Chapter 2 & 3 of 13, translated in Deity Yoga, Shambhala Publications, 1987. .The Great Exposition of Secret Mantra - Chapter 4 of 13, translated in Yoga Tantra, Shambhala Publications, 2012. .The Great Exposition of Secret Mantra - Chapter 11 & 12 of 13, translated in Great Treatise on the Stages of Mantra: Chapters XI–XII (The Creation Stage), Columbia University Press, 2013. .The Six Yogas of Naropa: Tsongkhapa's Commentary, Snow Lion Publications. .
Lamp of the Five StagesBrilliant Illumination of the Lamp of the Five Stages, Columbia University Press, 2011. .A Lamp to Illuminate the Five Stages, Library of Tibetan Classics, 2013. .
YogacaraOcean of Eloquence: Tsong Kha Pa's Commentary on the Yogacara Doctrine of Mind, State University of New York Press. .
OtherThe Splendor of an Autumn Moon: The Devotional Verse of Tsongkhapa, Wisdom Publications. .Three Principal Aspects of the Path, Tharpa Publications.Stairway to Nirvāṇa: A Study of the Twenty Saṃghas based on the works of Tsong-kha-pa, James B. Apple, State University of New York Press, 2008. .

See also
Galdan Namchot

Notes

Subnotes

References

Sources

Primary (in English Translation)

Secondary

 

 
 
 
 

Further reading
 Thupten Jinpa (2013), Self, Reality and Reason in Tibetan Philosophy: Tsongkhapa's Quest for the Middle Way'', Routledge

External links

Primary
Biography of Tsongkhapa Lobzang Drakpa by Joona Repo
Tsongkhapa: A Buddha in the Land of Snows by Thupten Jinpa
Biography of Lama Tsong Khapa by Sonam Rinchen
Secondary
Tsongkhapa, at the Stanford Encyclopedia of Philosophy

1357 births
1419 deaths
Scholars of Buddhism from Tibet
Tibetan philosophers
Ganden Tripas
Lamas
Rinpoches
Madhyamaka
Tibetan Buddhists from Tibet
14th-century Tibetan people
15th-century Tibetan people
Buddhist reformers
Rangtong
Founders of Buddhist sects
14th-century Buddhist monks
15th-century Buddhist monks